Otok is a municipality and a village in inland Dalmatia, Croatia, located east of Sinj, approximately 7 kilometers away. Otok is bordered by the river Cetina and mountain Kamešnica.

The total population of Otok municipality is 5,474, in the following settlements:
 Gala, population 896
 Korita, population 3
 Otok, population 3,090
 Ovrlja, 190
 Ruda, population 880
 Udovičić, population 415

References

Populated places in Split-Dalmatia County
Municipalities of Croatia